Microbotryum violaceum, also known as the anther smut fungus, was formerly known as Ustilago violacea. It is a Basidiomycete obligate parasite of many Caryophyllaceae. But it has now separated into many species due to its host specificity.

Meiosis in M. violaceum produces a tetrad of four haploid meiotic products.  Pairwise intra-tetrad mating can occur between these meiotic products.

Examples 
M. violaceum can infect and sterilize the plant species Silene latifolia by acting like a sexually transmitted infection.

References

External links 
 Microbotryum violaceum database
 Index Fungorum
 USDA ARS Fungal Database
 Genoscope

Fungal plant pathogens and diseases
Ustilaginomycotina
Fungi described in 1797
Taxa named by Christiaan Hendrik Persoon